The National Pharmaceutical Product Index or NAPPI is a comprehensive database of pharmaceutical codes for medical products classification used in South Africa. Each product has a unique NAPPI code which enables electronic data interchange throughout the health care delivery chain.

NAPPI is governed by the NAPPI Advisory Board (NAB), a non-profit organisation representing hospitals, medical schemes, medical scheme administrators, and medical and dental associations. MediKredit is responsible for the management and maintenance of the NAPPI Product File.

External links 
 MediKredit
 SA Pharmaceutical Journal
 Assess and process a medical claim
 Academic articles

Pharmacological classification systems
Medical databases
Healthcare in South Africa